Hou was a title for an ancient Chinese ruler, equivalent to King/Queen or Emperor/Empress. 

The Chinese character Hou (后) is an ideogrammic compounds, in oracle bone script it is written the same as Si (司, means "to rule") as the combination of mouth (口) and hand (手). Hou usually refers to female rulers in oracle bone script. In Xia Dynasty, the title for Kings of Xia were Hou, for example the expression Xia Hou Shi (夏后氏) means King of Xia, and the contemporary leader Houyi. Kings of Shang Dynasty had their own title Wang, and Hou turned to refer to the Queen, the wife of the King. This may reflect the fact that rulers were female in ancient times.

Ancient China
Positions of authority
Political history of China